Qaleh Qassab (also Romanized as Qal‘eh Qaşşāb) is a village in Tajan Rural District, in the Central District of Sarakhs County, Razavi Khorasan Province, Iran. At the 2006 census, its population was 273, in 60 families.

References 

Populated places in Sarakhs County